Louis-Antoine Beaunier (15 January 1779 in Melun – 20 August 1835 in Paris) was a French engineer.

People from Melun
1779 births
1835 deaths
19th-century French engineers
French railway pioneers